The 1984 Kansas City Royals season  was their 16th in Major League Baseball. The Royals won the American League West with a record of 84-78, but lost to the eventual World Series champion Detroit Tigers 3-0 in the 1984 American League Championship Series. Dan Quisenberry's 44 saves paced the American League.

Offseason 
 October 17, 1983: Eric Rasmussen was released by the Royals.
 December 8, 1983: Mike Armstrong and Duane Dewey (minors) were traded by the Royals to the New York Yankees for Steve Balboni and Roger Erickson.
December 8, 1983: Joe Beckwith was traded by the Los Angeles Dodgers to the Kansas City Royals for Joe Szekeley (minors), John Serritella (minors) and José Torres (minors).
 January 17, 1984: Steve Carter was drafted by the Kansas City Royals in the 2nd round of the 1984 amateur draft (January Secondary), but did not sign.
 March 31, 1984: Don Werner and Derek Botelho were traded by the Royals to the Chicago Cubs for Alan Hargesheimer.

Regular season 
 September 17, 1984: Reggie Jackson of the California Angels hit the 500th home run of his career against the Royals. It was the 17th anniversary of the day he hit his first home run. Jackson hit his 500th, at Anaheim Stadium off Bud Black of the Royals.

Season standings

Record vs. opponents

Notable transactions 
 May 10, 1984: Dane Iorg was purchased by the Royals from the St. Louis Cardinals.

Roster

Game log

Regular season

|-style=background:#bbb
| — || April 17 || || @ Tigers || colspan=8 | Postponed (Rain) (Makeup date: April 19)
|-style=background:#fbb
| 11 || April 18 || 6:35p.m. CST || @ Tigers || 3–4  || Hernández (1–0) || Beckwith (0–1) || – || 3:02 || 12,310 || 5–6 || L3
|-style=background:#cfc
| 12 || April 19 || 12:30p.m. CST || @ Tigers || 5–2 || Saberhagen (1–0) || Petry (2–1) || Quisenberry (5) || 2:27 || 12,100 || 6–6 || W1
|-

|-style=background:#fbb
| 25 || May 7 || 7:35p.m. CDT || Tigers || 3–10 || Berenguer (2–1) || Gubicza (0–3) || Bair (2) || 3:02 || 19,474 || 9–16 || L5
|-style=background:#fbb
| 26 || May 8 || 7:35p.m. CDT || Tigers || 2–5 || Morris (6–1) || Black (3–2) || – || 2:35 || 14,304 || 9–17 || L6
|-style=background:#fbb
| 27 || May 9 || 7:35p.m. CDT || Tigers || 1–3 || Petry (5–1) || Jackson (0–4) || López (4) || 2:48 || 15,709 || 9–18 || L7
|-

|-

|-style=background:#bbbfff
|colspan="12"|55th All-Star Game in San Francisco, CA
|-

|-style=background:#cfc
| 107 || August 3 || 6:35p.m. CDT || @ Tigers || 9–6 || Saberhagen (5–8) || Wilcox (11–7) || Quisenberry (28) || 2:37 || 39,480 || 51–56 || W1
|-style=background:#cfc
| 108 || August 4 || 1:15p.m. CDT || @ Tigers || 9–5 || Beckwith (4–2) || Bair (4–3) || – || 2:57 || 41,714 || 52–56 || W2
|-style=background:#cfc
| 109 || August 5 || 12:30p.m. CDT || @ Tigers || 5–4 || Saberhagen (6–8) || Hernández (6–1) || Quisenberry (29) || 2:57 || N/A || 53–56 || W3
|-style=background:#cfc
| 110 || August 5 || 4:02p.m. CDT || @ Tigers || 4–0 || Leibrandt (6–4) || Berenguer (5–8) || – || 2:37 || 42,761 || 54–56 || W4
|-style=background:#fbb
| 114 || August 10 || 7:35p.m. CDT || Tigers || 4–5 || López (10–0) || Beckwith (5–3) || Hernández (25) || 2:54 || 32,181 || 56–58 || L1
|-style=background:#fbb
| 115 || August 11 || 7:35p.m. CDT || Tigers || 5–9 || Morris (15–8) || Leibrandt (6–5) || López (12) || 2:42 || 40,501 || 56–59 || L2
|-style=background:#fbb
| 116 || August 12 || 1:35p.m. CDT || Tigers || 4–8 || Wilcox (12–7) || Saberhagen (6–9) || – || 2:47 || 32,753 || 56–60 || L3
|-

|-

|- style="text-align:center;"
| Legend:       = Win       = Loss       = PostponementBold = Royals team member

Postseason Game log

|-style=background:#fbb
| 1 || October 2 || 7:35p.m. CDT || Tigers || 1–8 || Morris (1–0) || Black (0–1) || – || 2:42 || 41,973 || 0–1 || L1
|-style=background:#fbb
| 2 || October 3 || 7:25p.m. CDT || Tigers || 3–5  || López (1–0) || Quisenberry (0–1) || – || 3:37 || 42,019 || 0–2 || L2
|-style=background:#fbb
| 3 || October 5 || 7:25p.m. CDT || @ Tigers || 0–1 || Wilcox (1–0) || Leibrandt (0–1) || Hernández (1) || 2:39 || 52,168 || 0–3 || L3
|-

|- style="text-align:center;"
| Legend:       = Win       = Loss       = PostponementBold = Royals team member

Player stats

Batting

Starters by position 
Note: Pos = Position; G = Games played; AB = At bats; H = Hits; Avg. = Batting average; HR = Home runs; RBI = Runs batted in

Other batters 
Note: G = Games played; AB = At bats; H = Hits; Avg. = Batting average; HR = Home runs; RBI = Runs batted in

Pitching

Starting pitchers 
Note: G = Games pitched; IP = Innings pitched; W = Wins; L = Losses; ERA = Earned run average; SO = Strikeouts

Other pitchers 
Note: G = Games pitched; IP = Innings pitched; W = Wins; L = Losses; ERA = Earned run average; SO = Strikeouts

Relief pitchers 
Note: G = Games pitched; W = Wins; L = Losses; SV = Saves; ERA = Earned run average; SO = Strikeouts

ALCS

Game 1 
October 2, Royals Stadium

Game 2 
October 3, Royals Stadium

Game 3 
October 5, Tiger Stadium

Farm system

References

Bibliography

External links 
1984 Kansas City Royals team at Baseball-Reference
1984 Kansas City Royals team at baseball-almanac.com

Kansas City Royals seasons
American League West champion seasons
Kansas City Royals
Kansas City